Mangesh Kudalkar is a Shiv Sena politician from Mumbai, Maharashtra. He is a member of the 13th Maharashtra Legislative Assembly. He represents Kurla Vidhan Sabha constituency of Mumbai, Maharashtra, India as a member of Shiv Sena.

Positions held
 2014: Elected to Maharashtra Legislative Assembly
 2019: Re-Elected to Maharashtra Legislative Assembly

See also
 Mumbai North Central Lok Sabha constituency

References

External links
 Official website 
  Shivsena Home Page 

Living people
Maharashtra MLAs 2014–2019
Shiv Sena politicians
Marathi politicians
Year of birth missing (living people)